Ponthir railway station was a railway station in the village of Ponthir in Torfaen, South Wales, UK.

History
The station was opened by the Pontypool, Caerleon and Newport Railway on 21 December 1874 or 1 June 1878. The Great Western Railway advertised in The Cambrian on 12 January 1877 for Tenders for the construction of a station and station yard at Ponthir. Goods facilities were withdrawn on 9 June 1958 and the station was closed to passengers on 30 September 1962.

The original station buildings were demolished but the stationmaster's house is now a private dwelling and a level crossing on the site is still in use.  The former station site is located on the Welsh Marches Line.

References

Notes

Sources

External links
Station on a navigable 1947 O.S. map

Disused railway stations in Torfaen
Railway stations in Great Britain opened in 1874
Railway stations in Great Britain closed in 1962
Former Great Western Railway stations